Ytu artemis is a species of myxophagan beetle in the genus Ytu. It was discovered in 1973 and named after the Greek goddess Artemis.

References

Myxophaga
Beetles described in 1973